The Peugeot Type 37 is an early motor vehicle produced in 1902 by the French auto-maker Peugeot at their Audincourt plant.   100 were produced.

The vehicle was powered by a single cylinder four stroke engine. On earlier small Peugeots power had been delivered to the driving wheels via a chain-drive mechanism, but for the Type 37 Peugeot did away with this approach. The engine was now mounted ahead of the driver, and power was delivered to the rear wheels via a rotating steel drive-shaft. The 652 cc engine, located ahead of the driver, produced . A top speed of 40 km/h (25 mph) was claimed.

The Type 37 had a  wheel base.

Sources and further reading 
 Wolfgang Schmarbeck: Alle Peugeot Automobile 1890-1990. Motorbuch-Verlag. Stuttgart 1990. 

Type 37
Cars introduced in 1902
1900s cars
Veteran vehicles